Hibiscus pusillus is a species of flowering plant in the family Malvaceae, native to seasonally dry areas of southern Africa. There is some confusion with Hibiscus trionum, with which it shares the common names bladderweed and Terblansbossie (Afrikaans}, perhaps due to the name Hibiscus pusillus  being a synonym of Hibiscus trionum , sometimes called the bladder hibiscus.

References

pusillus
Flora of Angola
Flora of Zimbabwe
Flora of Mozambique
Flora of Southern Africa
Plants described in 1800